The 2023 RFL League One is a professional rugby league football competition played in the United Kingdom and is the third tier of the sport for Rugby Football League (RFL) affiliated clubs. The sponsors for the league are the bookmakers, Betfred and the league will continue to be known as the Betfred League One.

Teams
The number of teams in League One was scheduled to remain at 11 with Keighley and Swinton who were promoted in 2022 being replaced by Dewsbury Rams and Workington Town, the teams relegated from the Championship, but on 22 December 2022 the RFL announced that West Wales Raiders had withdrawn from the league and that the season would proceed with just 10 clubs.

In January 2023 Midlands Hurricanes confirmed that the club would be moving from the Portway stadium to use the Alexander Stadium in Perry Park, Birmingham. In 2023 the club will only use the community pitch while the main stadium pitch recovers from its use during the 2022 Commonwealth Games.

Stadiums and locations

Rule changes
Changes in the operational rules were announced on 1 February 2023. 

On-field, the main change is that teams awarded a penalty for an offence at a scrum can now kick for goal. Previously such penalties were differential precluding the team from kicking for goal. The green card process has been clarified so that if the referee calls "time off" for a player to receive medical attention, the player must leave the pitch for two minutes. Teams will be allowed to name an 18th player (fifth interchange player) in the squad who can play if three or more players are withdrawn due to failing a head injury assessment (HIA). 

Off-field the graduated return to play process that applies after a player has suffered a concussion will be a minimum of 12 days (up from 11 in 2022).

Changes have also been made to the disciplinary process where the periods of suspension for the various grade of offences have been reduced but the use of fines increased.

Fixtures and results

With the withdrawal of West Wales Raiders, consideration was given to adding loop fixture to the season but a meeting of the 10 clubs decided against this and to proceed with an 18-match season with the dates where clubs would have played West Wales as byes.

Regular season table

References

RFL League 1
League One
League One
RFL League One